Cabotage Day  also called Maritime and Cabotage Day is an annual celebration related to merchant marine rights of Turkey held on 1 July in Turkey.

During the Ottoman Empire, the precursor of Turkey, coastwise shipping was mostly  carried off by foreign companies as permitted by the  Capitulations of the Ottoman Empire. However, by the Treaty of Lausanne signed on 24 July 1923, the capitulations were abolished. The law took effect on 1 July, the same year and this date is now known as the "cabotage day". Beginning by 2007 the name of the day was changed to "Maritime and Cabotage Day".

References

1926 establishments in Turkey
Maritime history of Turkey
Festivals in Turkey
July observances
Annual events in Turkey
Summer events in Turkey